Enrico Minutoli (died 1412) was an Italian Cardinal.

He was bishop of Bitonto from 1382 to 1389 and  then archbishop of Naples. He was also archpriest of the Liberian Basilica (1396) and Camerlengo of the Holy Roman Church (1406). He is buried in the Cappella Minutolo, Naples, with other members of the Minutolo family. He commissioned some of the work on the Naples Duomo, and had the Palazzo Arcivescovile built.

Notes

External links
  Biography
 

1412 deaths
15th-century Italian cardinals
Cardinal-bishops of Frascati
Cardinal-bishops of Sabina
Bishops of Bitonto
14th-century Italian Roman Catholic archbishops
15th-century Italian Roman Catholic archbishops
Archbishops of Naples
Deans of the College of Cardinals
Cardinal-nephews
Year of birth unknown
Archbishops of Trani